Carl Brisson (24 December 1893 – 25 September 1958), born Carl Frederik Ejnar Pedersen, was a Danish film actor and singer. He appeared in 13 films between 1918 and 1935, including two silent films directed by Alfred Hitchcock. In the 1934 film Murder at the Vanities, he introduced the popular song "Cocktails for Two".

Life and career
Before his acting and singing career, Brisson was a prizefighter for a few short spells between 1912 and 1915. He attracted attention when he appeared as Prince Danilo in the 1923 London production of The Merry Widow at Daly's. He appeared in the same role when it was revived at the Lyceum Theatre the following year, and frequently reprised.

In August 1924, Brisson toured the provinces as Karl in Katja the Dancer, eventually returning to London to appear in The Apache at the London Palladium, and later made his British screen debut in Hitchcock's The Ring.

Brisson was married to Cleo Willard Brisson from 1915 to his death, and was the father of producer Frederick Brisson and father-in-law of Frederick's wife, actress Rosalind Russell. He died of jaundice in Copenhagen.

Filmography

 The Mysterious Footprints (1918) 
 The Ring (1927)
 The Manxman (1929)
 The Triumph of the Heart (1929)
 The American Prisoner (1929)
 Knowing Men (1930)
 Song of Soho (1930) 
 Prince of Arcadia (1933)
 Two Hearts in Waltz Time (1934)
 Murder at the Vanities (1934)
 All the King's Horses (1935)
 Ship Cafe (1935)

References

External links

Carl Brisson at Theatricalia
Carl Brisson at Virtual History

1893 births
1958 deaths
20th-century Danish male actors
Danish male film actors
Danish male silent film actors
Male actors from Copenhagen
Apollo Records artists